Meyronnes (Vivaro-Alpine: Maironas) is a former commune in the Alpes-de-Haute-Provence department in southeastern France. On 1 January 2016, it was merged into the new commune Val-d'Oronaye.

Population

See also
 Ouvrage Saint Ours Haut
 Ubaye Valley
 Communes of the Alpes-de-Haute-Provence department

References

Former communes of Alpes-de-Haute-Provence
Alpes-de-Haute-Provence communes articles needing translation from French Wikipedia
Populated places disestablished in 2016